Montesia fasciolata is a species of beetle in the family Cerambycidae. It was described by Galileo and Martins in 1990.

References

Aerenicini
Beetles described in 1990